Amenherkhepshef (also Amenherkhepshef D to distinguish him from earlier people of the same name) was an ancient Egyptian prince and a son of Ramesses VI with Queen Nubkhesbed. He lived in the mid 12th century BCE during the Twentieth Dynasty of the late New Kingdom period. 

He died before his father and was buried in the reused sarcophagus of Twosret in an extension of the tomb originally planned for Chancellor Bay, KV13. The tomb is located in the Valley of the Kings, on the west bank of the Nile, in Thebes, Egypt.

References

Bibliography

Ancient Egyptian princes
People of the Twentieth Dynasty of Egypt
Ramesses VI